Leucopogon opponens is a species of flowering plant in the heath family Ericaceae and is endemic to the south-west of Western Australia. It is an erect, slender shrub with its leaves arranged in opposite pairs, and white, tube-shaped flowers.

Description
The flowers are arranged on the ends of branches or in leaf axils in short, dense spikes. The bracts are concave and shorter than the bracteoles that are about half as long as the sepals. Flowering mainly occurs from July to October.

Taxonomy
This species was first formally described in 1867 by Ferdinand von Mueller who gave it the name Styphelia opponens in Fragmenta Phytographiae Australiae from specimens collected near the Phillips River by George Maxwell. In 1868, George Bentham transferred the species to Leucopogon as L. opponens in Flora Australiensis. The specific epithet (opponens) means "opposing", referring to the arrangement of the leaves.

Distribution and habitat
Leucopogon opponens grows in sand and loamy clay on sandplains in the Esperance Plains and Mallee bioregions of south-western Western Australia, and is listed as "not threatened" by the Government of Western Australia Department of Biodiversity, Conservation and Attractions.

References

opponens
Ericales of Australia
Flora of Western Australia
Plants described in 1867
Taxa named by Ferdinand von Mueller